Guilbert and Betelle was an architecture firm formed as a partnership of Ernest F. Guilbert and James Oscar Betelle. The firm specialized in design of schools on the East Coast of the United States, with an emphasis on the "Collegiate Gothic" style.

Betelle took over the firm after Guilbert died in 1916, and oversaw design of hundreds of schools, including Greenwich High School in Greenwich, Connecticut and the Radburn School in Fair Lawn, New Jersey, both of which are listed on the National Register of Historic Places. Other notable buildings for which the firm was responsible include the Essex County Hall of Records and the Essex Club (now home of the New Jersey Historical Society).

Structures
The following is a list of structures designed by the firm, ordered by state and locality:

Connecticut
Glenville School (Greenwich, Connecticut) (NRHP-listed)
Greenwich:
 Cos Cob School, c. 1916
 Greenwich High School (Greenwich Town Hall), c. 1925
New Britain:
 State Normal School (Davidson Hall, CCSU), c. 1922

Delaware
 Pierre S. duPont Rural Schools, c. 1919-1921
 William P. Bancroft School, c.1928
 Charles B. Lore School ('Lorelton' assisted living home), c. 1932

New Jersey
East Orange:
 East Orange High School (demolished), c. 1911
Jersey City:
 State Normal School at Jersey City, c. 1930
Newark:
 Newark Central High School, c. 1912
 Chamber of Commerce Building, c. 1923
 Cleveland School, c. 1913
 East Side High School, c. 1911
 The Essex Club (New Jersey Historical Society), c. 1926 (NRHP-listed)
 Essex County Boys Vocational School, c. 1931
 Essex County Girls Vocational School, c. 1930
 Essex County Hall of Records, c. 1926
 Home of Ernest F. Guilbert, c. 1910
 Home of Franklin Murphy, Jr., c. 1925
 Newark Normal School, c. 1913 (currently Technology High School)
 Newark Public School of Fine and Industrial Arts, c. 1931
 Ridge Street School, c. 1913
 Robert Treat Hotel, c. 1916
 South Side High School, c. 1913 (currently Malcolm X Shabazz High School)
 Weequahic High School, c. 1932
 West Side High School, c. 1926
South Orange and Maplewood:
 Clinton Elementary, c. 1929
 Columbia High School, c. 1927
 First Street School, c. 1924
 Jefferson Elementary, c. 1924
 Montrose Elementary, c. 1924
 Maplewood Junior High, c.1930
 Maplewood Municipal Building, c.1931
 Marshall Elementary, c.1922
 South Mountain Elementary, c.1929
 Tuscan Elementary, c. 1924
Summit:

 Franklin Elementary
 Jefferson Elementary
 Summit High School (Summit Middle School), c. 1923
 Washington Elementary, c. 1931
Vineland:
 Vineland High School (the Landis School), c. 1927
 Thomas A. Edison Jr. High, c. 1927
West Orange
 West Orange High School (Seton Hall Preparatory School)

New York

Bronxville
 The Bronxville School, c. 1930
Great Neck
 Great Neck High School, c. 1926
New Rochelle
 New Rochelle High School, c. 1926
Tarrytown
 Washington Irving School, c. 1925

Pennsylvania
Williamsport:
 Thaddeus Stevens Jr. High School, c. 1927
 Science Hall, Lincoln University, c. 1925

NRHP-listed
Duplicative to the above, the buildings designed by these architects which survive and are listed on the National Register of Historic Places (NRHP) are:
Essex Club, Address Restricted Newark NJ Guilbert & Betelle
Glenville School (Greenwich, Connecticut), 449 Pemberwick Rd. Greenwich CT Betelle, James Oscar
Iron Hill School No. 112C, 1335 Old Baltimore Pike, Pencader Hundred Newark DE Betelle, James Oscar
Charles B. Lore Elementary School, Fourth St. and Woodlawn Ave. Wilmington DE Guilbert and Betelle
One or more buildings in Military Park (Newark) Commons Historic District, Roughly bounded by Washington Pl., McCarter Hwy, E. Park St. and Raymond Blvd. Newark NJ Guilbert and Betelle 
New Jersey Manual Training and Industrial School for Colored Youth, N of Burlington Rd., W of I-295 Bordentown NJ Guilbert & Betelle
Public School No. 111-C, DE 7 Christiana DE Betelle, James O.
Ross Point School, Road 448 near Jct. with Road 62 Laurel DE Guilbert and Betelle
Vineland High School, 61 W. Landis Ave. Vineland NJ Betelle, J.O.

External links
 "James Betelle, Where Are You?" -  biographical and professional history of Betelle.

References

Defunct architecture firms based in New Jersey
Defunct architecture firms based in New York (state)
Design companies established in 1906
Companies based in Newark, New Jersey
Gothic Revival architects
American companies established in 1906